Ephysteris scimitarella is a moth in the family Gelechiidae. It was described by Bernard Landry in 2010. It is found on the Galápagos Islands.

The length of the forewings is 4.2-4.7 mm. Adults have been recorded on wing in February, March and May.

References

Ephysteris
Moths described in 2010